Air Vice Marshal Julius Otchere Boateng was a Ghanaian air force personnel and served in the Ghana Air Force. He was the Chief of Air Staff of the Ghana Air Force from 20 May 2005 to 28 January 2009.

References

Chiefs of Air Staff (Ghana)
Ghanaian military personnel
Ghana Air Force personnel
Living people
Year of birth missing (living people)
National Defence College, India alumni